Decapoda Shock is a 2011 Spanish short science fiction action parody film written, directed, co-produced, and with brief animated sequences by Javier Chillon. The film depicts an astronaut infected by an alien crab-like creature, transforming him into a decapod crustacean/human hybrid and whose family has disappeared, both the result of a sinister conspiracy, for which he seeks vengeance. As of 2019, Chillon's second film has been selected for more than 300 international film festivals, and received over thirty awards and honours within the first two years of its release, including a Méliès d'Argent.

Synopsis
An astronaut explores the red dirt surface of an alien planet, where a crab-like creature reaches out of the soil and snips through his space suit. The infection that results transforms him into a cosmic decapod crustacean/human hybrid, with the head and claws of a crayfish or lobster. When he returns to Earth and tries to reconnect with his family, he discovers that he's been the victim of a sinister conspiracy, and takes revenge on those responsible for his family's disappearance.

Cast
Actors
Federico Martín • Hombre-Cangrejo Man ("Crab Man" or "Crayfish Man")
 • Astronaut 
José Antonio Fuentes • Eric Gibraltar
Alexei Chillon • Son
Pilar García • Mother
Voice
 • Astronaut Voice

Themes
Decapoda Shock shares a number of themes with Javier Chillon's first film, Die Schneider Krankheit: monstrous creatures resulting from "spatial" mutations or genetic manipulation, primarily derived from the science fiction B movies of the 1950s, the "atomic age".

Production

Background and financing
Less than a year after the release of Javier Chillon's very successful first short film, Die Schneider Krankheit (2008), a film that includes the "Hollywood look of the 50s" among its influences, Chillon was in Paris pitching a project called Outfinite, which would "pay tribute to sci-fi B movies and blaxploitation pics." The film that became Decapoda Shock was ultimately self-produced by Chillon and his friend Luis Fuentes, who was also the cinematographer on Die Schneider Krankheit; as before, they relied on themselves and on their "very talented friends" for support: "we didn't have much money to spend (the final budget was around 1500€) so we made everything ourselves or called our friends for help." The film was made for far less money than Die Schneider Krankheit, and was also less time-consuming; the director's love of the American B movie genre he imitates in these films happens also to be a way to get a film made on a limited budget.

Development and writing
Chillon wanted to "make something very different" from his previous film: "There were very different things that I wanted to try and, in a way, I wrote the script to accommodate all of them in a wacky story. I spent two years in the making of the film." The director allowed himself more spontaneity and improvisation this time around, shooting without a fleshed out script: there was a "concise idea" but the story elements were added gradually over time, "on the fly".

Filming
Decapoda Shock was filmed between July 2009 and March 2011 in Guadalajara, Spain and Madrid, using an HDV camera, the Canon XL-H1, "because a friend owned it and we could borrow it any time we needed it during these two years." Unlike the previous film, it was shot in colour, with orange the "main dominant" and also the main colour "for clothes, props, and so on", with a view to achieving "a kind of a comic book feeling." The reason the film took so long to shoot was the range of "locations and different actors and the tight budget"; as an example, the first scene with the astronaut was shot in the course of one year using three different locations and three different actors (two of them for the hands).

Release
Its Spanish premiere was at the Sitges International Fantastic Film Festival in October. In October 2013, it was selected by Peter Kuplowsky at the Toronto After Dark Film Festival as a standout for the internet premiere of Fangoria Magazine'''s Screamers short film series. As of 2019, the film had been selected for more than 330 international film festivals.

Home mediaDecapoda Shock and the director's first film, Die Schneider Krankheit, appear as bonus material on a Spanish-subtitled DVD of Daniel Cockburn's 2010 feature film, You Are Here.

Online platform
The film is available in its entirety on Vimeo.

Reception
Critical response
Robert Barry reviewed Decapoda Shock after seeing it at its premiere, saying it "mixed an inventive and articulate use of 'real' cinematography with the freedom of expression afforded by occasional intrusions of animation"; he voted for it in the audience prize in the festival's short film competition. A statement by the Fanonmenon jury awarding the Silver Méliès to the film at the Leeds International Film Festival, gives the reasons why it was chosen: "Decapoda Shock was very creative and achieved a lot in a short space of time – hilarious storytelling, strong pastiche techniques, multi-media visualisation and displayed a passion for the genre." Adrienne Fox remarks that Chillón taps into revenge films, spaghetti westerns, and exploitation films "with some screaming guitar to make a very memorable short." Describing the film as coming "from way the heck out in left field", Paul Bowers suggests despite the plot making "only halfway" sense, it's "fine", and: "You'll be too enraptured by the horror-schlocky camera cuts, animated depictions of evil government cabals, and close-up shots of gored anonymous henchmen to put all the pieces together anyway." Kate Williamson and Gem Carmella say the film does what it deliberately sets out to do: "confuse, shock, surprise, and most importantly, to make fun of itself"; initially, it passes itself off as "a badly made but serious film", but "its cheap feel is actually the result of a precise and perfectly executed set of technical considerations. Quite simply, you’ve got to be pretty good at what you do to make something look this bad"; the film is a "master class in parody". Similarly, Samantha Hautea calls the film "a celebration of the absurd", "tying in various film clichés". Andrew Robertson said "once you have seen it you cannot help but measure every film you have ever seen against it ... The colour-palette is washed and perfect, and the high-drama and STAGGERING ACTION are such that one cannot help but reach for the hyphen and CAPS LOCK keys."

AccoladesDecapoda Shock'' received over thirty awards and honours within the first two years of its release.

2011

2012

2013

References

External links
Official online release on Vimeo
Official trailer on YouTube
 

Spanish short films
Spanish science fiction drama films
Spanish science fiction horror films